Time to Move is the first studio album by Canadian singer Blake McGrath. It was released in Canada on November 2, 2010. Five singles were released from the album.

Track listing

Other Credits
"Stage Fright" - Guitar: Chris Perry
"Hate the Rain" - Music: Alexandra Kane
"Turn It Up" - Music: Ritchie of Soundsmith Productions
"Lullaby" - Bass Guitar: Josh Cohen / Guitar: Justin Abedin

Stage Fright Tour
In Spring of 2011 McGrath toured throughout Canada at 25 different venues under the tour name Stage Fright Tour.

Charts

2010 debut albums
Interscope Records albums
Blake McGrath albums